Valerie Jill Haworth (15 August 1945 – 3 January 2011) was an English-American actress. She appeared in films throughout the 1960s, and started making guest appearances on television in 1963. She originated the role of Sally Bowles in the musical Cabaret on Broadway in 1966.

Early life
Haworth was born in Hove, Sussex, to a textile magnate father and a mother who trained as a ballet dancer. She was named Valerie Jill in honour of the day she was born, Victory over Japan Day or V.J. Day. She took ballet lessons at the Sadler's Wells Ballet School to escape from an unhappy home when her parents separated in 1953. Later she attended the Corona Stage School.

Career
Her first film appearance was in the remake of The 39 Steps (1959), directed by Ralph Thomas, when she had a non-speaking part as a schoolgirl. Next she played another schoolgirl in The Brides of Dracula (1960), directed by Terence Fisher. 

Otto Preminger was seeking a new fresh face for the role of Karen Hansen, an ill-fated Jewish-Danish refugee girl in love with Dov Landau (Sal Mineo), for his film Exodus (1960). He travelled to Britain and Germany, with his fiancée Hope Bryce, searching for a girl to cast in the role. After looking at hundreds of girls, Preminger spotted a photo of Haworth in a modelling magazine for the Corona Theatre School. 

Haworth went to the three auditions in order to get out of school. She was only 15 years old when she was cast as Karen Hansen in her first acting role in a feature film. Haworth appeared in the 31 July 1960 issue of Parade magazine. She and Mineo appeared on the front cover of the 12 December 1960 issue of LIFE, part of a photo essay by Gjon Mili.

Under contract to Preminger (for five years), she also worked with him in The Cardinal, (1963) as Lalage Menton, and In Harm's Way (1965), as Ensign Annalee Dorne, a Nurse Corps officer who, while engaged to Ensign Jeremiah Torrey (Brandon deWilde), commits suicide after being raped by Captain Paul Eddington, Jr. (Kirk Douglas). Haworth liked working with De Wilde, Patricia Neal, and Douglas, but called John Wayne "the meanest, nastiest man with the worst attitude I ever worked with." Wayne's other costars didn't share her opinion. 

Preminger insisted that she live in New York City to become Americanized, but he did not want her to live in Los Angeles for fear she would just be a "starlet a-go-go". She was approached to be the title character in Lolita (1962) with James Mason, but because Preminger held her contract, he vetoed the idea. 

Mineo and Haworth were also considered for the film David and Lisa (1962), but once again Preminger refused permission. Preminger let her make three French films; Les Mystères de Paris (as Fleur de Marie; 1962),  (as Cécilia; 1963), and Ton ombre est la mienne (as Sylvie "Devi" Bergerat; 1963). Haworth co-starred alongside David McCallum in the Outer Limits episode, "The Sixth Finger" (1963). Haworth visited Mineo in Utah in November 1962 and had a nonspeaking role as an extra in The Greatest Story Ever Told (1965).

She made four appearances on the television programme 12 O'Clock High. In "The Sound of Distant Thunder," she played an English girl, Mary, who falls in love with Lieutenant Andy Lathrop (played by Peter Fonda). The same season, she played a deaf girl, Nora Burgess, in an episode entitled "To Heinie with Love". She then played Lieutenant Fay Vendry in two episodes, "Runway in the Dark" (1965) and "The Hotshot."

In 1965, she appeared in an episode of The Rogues entitled "Mr. White's Christmas" as Timothea, and really loved working with David Niven and Charles Boyer. She appeared in one of the final episodes of the series Rawhide, "Duel at Daybreak", as Vicki Woodruff, alongside co-actors Clint Eastwood and Charles Bronson. Haworth hurt her back in an accident on the set when she jumped from a runaway buggy and team of horses. She then caught pneumonia and was bedridden for two months after standing waist-deep in a man-made pond for six hours doing retakes.

She starred in the horror films It! (1967), The Haunted House of Horror (1969), Tower of Evil (1972), Home for the Holidays (1972), and The Mutations (1974). She took a part in It! only for the money, hated her hair in the film, and hated the film altogether. Haworth liked working with Roddy McDowall, who brought her the poster for the film (on her opening night of Cabaret), and wrote "S-h" in front of the title.

While filming It! she met Hal Prince, who was doing research for a musical based on Goodbye to Berlin by Christopher Isherwood. Prince asked her if she could sing, to which she claimed, "Louder than Merman." She played Sally Bowles in the original Broadway cast of the 1966 musical Cabaret, a part she played for almost two and a half years. Judi Dench took over the role when the production debuted in London in 1968. Haworth's other stage roles included Bedroom Farce and Butterflies Are Free.

Haworth turned down working on Hawaii Five-O because of the reputation of the show's star, Jack Lord, for being a hard-driving perfectionist.

Personal life
While making Exodus, Haworth became friends, first, and then lovers, with Sal Mineo, and they remained friends until his death in 1976. She later told author Michael Michaud that she thought Courtney Burr III, who later had a long-term relationship with Mineo, was the "love of Mineo's life."

Haworth dated television producer Aaron Spelling in the summer of 1965, when he was 42 and she was 19. Spelling reportedly told friends that he hoped that Haworth would be the next Mrs. Spelling, but Haworth's mother, Nancy, reportedly "scoffed" at the idea.

Later life and death
Haworth lived on New York City's Upper East Side for many years with her mother. She died of natural causes at the age of 65 on 3 January 2011 in Manhattan. She is buried at Kensico Cemetery.

Filmography

Film

Television

References

External links
 
 
 
 

1945 births
2011 deaths
English expatriates in the United States
English film actresses
English musical theatre actresses
English television actresses
English voice actresses
People from Hove
Actresses from Sussex
Burials at Kensico Cemetery